Leila Lejeune (née Duchemann; born 16 March 1976 in Le Port, Réunion) is a French handballer who plays for the French national team. She represented France at the 2004 Summer Olympics in Athens. Lejeune scored six goals in the match against Hungary.

International honours
National team
World Championship:
Gold Medalist: 2003
Silver Medalist: 1999

Club
EHF Cup:
Winner: 2004

References

External links
 Profile on EHF website

1976 births
Living people
French female handball players
Olympic handball players of France
Handball players at the 2000 Summer Olympics
Handball players at the 2004 Summer Olympics